Destin Choice Route (born October 31, 1990), better known by his stage name JID (also stylized J.I.D), is an American rapper. He is a part of the musical collective Spillage Village, founded by EarthGang in 2010, with Hollywood JB, JordxnBryant, and 6lack, among others. He is signed to J. Cole's Dreamville Records and Interscope Records. He is also a member of the hip hop supergroup Zoink Gang, with Smino, Buddy, and Guapdad 4000.

JID began gaining recognition after releasing several independent projects such as Route of Evil (2012), Para Tu (2013) and DiCaprio (2015). His debut studio album, The Never Story, was released in 2017 to public praise and included the single "Never". He released his second album, DiCaprio 2, in 2018; it contains the singles "151 Rum" and "Off Deez" (with J. Cole) and also received critical acclaim. In 2021, he released the single "Enemy" with pop rock band Imagine Dragons, which became his highest charting and most popular single, peaking at number 5 on the Billboard Hot 100. His most recent album, The Forever Story (2022), received widespread acclaim from critics and became his highest charting album peaking at number 12 on the Billboard 200.

Early life 
Destin Choice Route was born October 31, 1990, in Atlanta, Georgia. His parents were Carl Louis Route Jr. and Kathy Jean Route. The youngest of seven children, he adopted the moniker JID from his grandmother's nickname for him based on his "jittery" behavior. Route grew up listening to Sly and the Family Stone and Earth, Wind & Fire before shifting to the 1990s New York hip-hop scene and rappers such as Jay-Z, Nas and Mobb Deep. He attended Stephenson High School, where he played football as a defensive back. He received a scholarship to play NCAA Division I football at Hampton University, where he redshirted his first year, then played two seasons before he was kicked off the team. Route eventually moved in with Doctur Dot and Johnny Venus from EarthGang who he met from his time in Virginia.

Musical career

2010–2016: Career beginnings 
JID released his first mixtape Cakewalk on May 18, 2010. Earlier that year, he formed Spillage Village with EarthGang, Hollywood JB, and Jordxn Bryant. He released his second mixtape, Cakewalk 2 on June 29, 2011. He released his third mixtape, Route of All Evil on June 25, 2012, with guest features from relatively unheard artists EarthGang and Stillz. JID funded his music career with jobs at call centers and delivering pizza before he started to get booked for local live shows. On October 22, 2013, his next mixtape was released titled Para Tu. The mixtape was later re-released on December 29, 2017.

In 2014, he opened up with EarthGang and Bas on Ab-Soul's These Days Tour following the release of Spillage Village's first collaboration project, Bears Like This. On January 26, 2015, he released his first extended play DiCaprio EP. On July 6, Spillage Village released their second collaboration project Bears Like This Too. He also toured with Omen on the Elephant Eyes Tour and Bas on the Too High to Riot Tour. On December 2, 2016, Spillage Village released Bears Like This Too Much with features from J. Cole and Bas, and production from Mac Miller, Ducko Mcfli, Childish Major and J. Cole among others.

2017: The Never Story 

On February 20, 2017, it was announced that he had signed to J. Cole's Dreamville label, first releasing the single "Never". The full-length album, The Never Story was released on March 10, 2017. The album includes guest features from EarthGang, 6LACK, and Mereba, and production from J. Cole, Hollywood JB, Christo and Childish Major, among others. He later released three more music videos from the album: "D/vision", "Hereditary", and "EdEddnEddy".

He was also an opening act on the 4 Your Eyez Only Tour in 2017 in the North American and European legs. On October 10, JID appeared alongside rappers Cozz, Kodie Shane and Ali Tomineek in a cypher at the BET Hip Hop Awards. In November 2017, JID co-headlined in his Never Had Shit Tour with EarthGang, and guests Lute, Chaz French, and Mereba. It included 15 dates in North America, and continued in 2018, with 19 dates in Europe. On December 13, JID appeared on a remix with Foster The People and Saba called "Pay The Man".

2018–2020: DiCaprio 2 

In June 2018, he was featured on the cover of XXL's 2018 Freshman Class. In July, he was featured on Denzel Curry's "Sirens" from Ta13oo, and was announced he would go on tour with Mac Miller and Thundercat. However, the tour has since been cancelled due to the passing of Mac Miller. The first single for his second album was released on September 18, titled "151 Rum". On October 3, 2018, JID premiered the song "Working Out" on A COLORS SHOW. On his birthday, his second album DiCaprio 2 was announced for a release date of November 26, 2018, and revealed the tracklist soon after. The album's second official single, "Off Deez" featuring J. Cole, was released on November 6. Other collaborators on the album include A$AP Ferg, 6LACK, Ella Mai, BJ the Chicago Kid, Method Man and Joey Bada$$, with production mainly coming from his in-house team of Christo, Hollywood JB, J. Cole and Elite, among others.

DiCaprio 2 was released on November 26, 2018, to positive reviews and critical acclaim. JID announced the first leg of his headlining Catch Me If You Can tour, which included 34 dates, beginning in January 2019. The supporting acts were revealed to be Reason, Hardo, and Lou The Human. On February 9, JID's show in Ithaca, New York was shut down by the police due to a visible crack forming in the ceiling underneath the venue where the concert was held. On February 12, 2019, JID announced the second leg of his Catch Me If You Can tour. The tour includes 26 dates starting in May, and features supporting acts Saba, Deante' Hitchcock, and Mereba.

In 2019, JID was part of the Dreamville compilation album Revenge of the Dreamers III. The singles "Down Bad" and "Costa Rica" were certified gold by the RIAA. In 2020, as part of Spillage Village, he was featured on the singles "End of Daze" and "Baptize", for their fourth collective album Spilligion.

2021–present: The Forever Story 

JID was featured on Doja Cat's song "Options", included on her Grammy-nominated third album, Planet Her. He later collaborated with Imagine Dragons on the mega-hit "Enemy"; it peaked at number five on the Billboard Hot 100, becoming his highest charting song.

JID teased his third album, The Forever Story, throughout 2021. The first and lead single from the album, "Surround Sound" featuring 21 Savage and Baby Tate, was released on January 14, 2022. On March 31, he appeared on the Dreamville compilation D-Day: A Gangsta Grillz Mixtape, on the songs "Stick" and "Barry From Simpson". On August 9, JID released the second single from The Forever Story, titled "Dance Now", featuring Kenny Mason.

The Forever Story was released on August 26, 2022, including guest appearances from Kenny Mason, EarthGang, 21 Savage, Baby Tate, Lil Durk, Ari Lennox, Yasiin Bey, Lil Wayne, Johntá Austin, Ravyn Lenae and Eryn Allen Kane.

On September 8, 2022, JID performed an NPR Tiny Desk Concert.

Artistry

Influences 
Growing up, JID's first connection with music was through his parents' collection of classic funk and soul LPs. He names Sly and the Family Stone, D'Angelo, Wu-Tang Clan, Little Dragon, boom bap, New York hip hop (i.e. Nas, Jay-Z) and Arctic Monkeys as his biggest influences. He also cited fellow Atlanta artists OutKast, T.I., Goodie Mob and Gucci Mane as influences.

Discography

Studio albums 
 The Never Story (2017)
 DiCaprio 2 (2018)
 The Forever Story (2022)

Collaborative albums 
Revenge of the Dreamers 3 (2019)
 Spilligion  (2020)

Tours 
Headlining
 Never Had Shit Tour  (2017–18)
 Catch Me If You Can Tour (2019)
 Luv Is 4ever Tour  (2023)

Supporting
 Elephant Eyes Tour  (2015)
 Too High To Riot Tour  (2016)
 I Told You Tour  (2016)
 4 Your Eyez Only Tour  (2017)
 The Swimming Tour  (2018; cancelled)
 Confessions of a Dangerous Mind Tour  (2019)

Awards and nominations

References 

1990 births
Living people
American hip hop singers
African-American male rappers
Rappers from Atlanta
Southern hip hop musicians
Dreamville Records artists
21st-century American rappers
21st-century American male musicians
Interscope Records artists
21st-century African-American musicians